Nelson Fu or Fu Lianzhang (1894–1968) was a Chinese medical doctor. He was one of the few Western-trained medical doctors to have made the Long March and later, in Beijing, a Vice-Minister of Public Health, to be responsible for the health of the Communist Party elite.  In 1955, he was awarded the rank of lieutenant general of the People's Liberation Army.

In the 1920s and 1930s, Fu lived and worked in the then-prefectural seat of Changting (now Tingzhou town) in western Fujian Province. He was a senior medical doctor at its British Christian missionary Hospital of the Gospel.
 
During the Cultural Revolution, Fu was severely persecuted by Vice Chairman Lin Biao as well as by his subordinates, particularly Qiu Huizuo and, despite Mao Zedong's attempts to protect him, he was subsequently beaten and imprisoned with the accusation that Fu was "withholding medicine when Deputy Commander Lin was ill [in order] to harm him". He died in prison on March 29, 1968, at the age of 74.

References 

People persecuted to death during the Cultural Revolution
Chinese Communist Party politicians from Fujian
1894 births
1968 deaths
People's Republic of China politicians from Fujian
Politicians from Longyan
Hakka healthcare people
People's Liberation Army generals from Fujian
Chinese public health doctors
20th-century Chinese physicians
Hakka politicians
Physicians from Fujian